Porter is a town in Westchester Township, Porter County, in the U.S. state of Indiana. The population was 4,858 at the 2010 census.  Porter is in the Indiana Dunes ecosystem, which played a role in the creation of The Nature Conservancy, and inspired conservation efforts.

Porter is noted for its proximity to Indiana Dunes State Park and for its railroad heritage.  Porter was the southern terminus for the Chicago and West Michigan Railway.

History
Porter had its start in the 1850s when the railroad was extended to that point.

Historic sites
The Joseph Bailly Homestead is located in Indiana Dunes National Park on Howe Road, just north of U.S. 20.  It is the residence of three generations of the Bailly family.  Joseph and Marie Bailly arrived here in 1822 from the St. Joseph River in Michigan.  He had been a fur trader on Lake Michigan for nearly 30 years when he set up his family home along the Little Calumet River.

The Chellberg Farm is also a three generation home, but of  the family of Anders Kjellburg (Chellberg).  He brought his family to this Swedish community in 1869, purchasing  from the Bailly descendants.  The farm is located on Mineral Springs Road, north of U.S. 20.

The Augsburg Swedish Lutheran Church and Cemetery are located on Beam Street, west of town.  The Cemetery was begun in 1878.

The Willow Creek Confrontation, an altercation between railroads, occurred in Willow Creek which is in Porter, and is memorialized with a historical marker.

North of Willow Creek is the site of another significant event involving the town's railroads. Porter Junction is where the New York Central Railroad and its subsidiary, the Michigan Central Railroad, crossed each other at grade. (Michigan Central was also involved in the Willow Creek Confrontation noted above. The Pere Marquette Railway also diverted from this location just east of the level crossing, also known as a "diamond".) 

In 1921, the crew of a northbound MIC passenger train missed a signal to stop before the "diamonds" in order to let a westbound NYC passenger train through. As a result, the MIC train struck a derail device meant for such a situation so as to prevent the trains from colliding, but in spite of derailing, the MIC train didn't completely stop until after part of it was already obstructing the diamonds. The crew of the NYC train couldn't stop in time, and smashed through one of the MIC's coaches between 45 and 55 mph before derailing itself.

The collision resulted in the grisly deaths of 35 passengers on the MIC train, as well as the deaths of the engineer and fireman on the NYC train. The crash gained such notoriety due to the graphic aftermath that it eventually pushed Congress to mandate the installation of cab signaling in locomotives throughout the United States. The diamond crossing, meanwhile, was removed sometime during the Conrail era.

In addition to the Joseph Bailly Homestead, the Good Fellow Club Youth Camp and Porter Town Hall are listed on the National Register of Historic Places.

Geography
Porter is located at  (41.626005, -87.071798).

Demographics

2010 census
As of the census of 2010, there were 4,858 people, 1,832 households, and 1,310 families living in the town. The racial makeup of the town was 94.3% White, 1.1% African American, 0.3% Native American, 0.9% Asian, 1.6% from other races, and 1.7% from two or more races. Hispanic or Latino of any race were 6.6% of the population.

There were 1,832 households, of which 35.6% had children under the age of 18 living with them, 56.3% were married couples living together, 9.7% had a female householder with no husband present, 5.5% had a male householder with no wife present, and 28.5% were non-families. 21.5% of all households were made up of individuals, and 6.1% had someone living alone who was 65 years of age or older. The average household size was 2.65 and the average family size was 3.12.

The median age in the town was 39.1 years. 25.6% of residents were under the age of 18; 7.6% were between the ages of 18 and 24; 27% were from 25 to 44; 29.2% were from 45 to 64; and 10.7% were 65 years of age or older. The gender makeup of the town was 49.5% male and 50.5% female.

2000 census
As of the census of 2000, there were 4,972 people, 1,844 households, and 1,300 families living in the town. The racial makeup of the town was 96.14% White, 0.82% African American, 0.22% Native American, 0.58% Asian, 0.62% from other races, and 1.61% from two or more races. Hispanic or Latino of any race were 4.69% of the population.

There were 1,844 households, out of which 38.4% had children under the age of 18 living with them, 55.8% were married couples living together, 10.8% had a female householder with no husband present, and 29.5% were non-families. 23.3% of all households were made up of individuals, and 5.9% had someone living alone who was 65 years of age or older. The average household size was 2.62 and the average family size was 3.12.

In the town, the population was spread out, with 28.3% under the age of 18, 9.9% from 18 to 24, 32.6% from 25 to 44, 21.5% from 45 to 64, and 7.8% who were 65 years of age or older. The median age was 33 years. For every 100 females, there were 95.4 males. For every 100 females age 18 and over, there were 92.7 males.

The median income for a household in the town was $50,625, and the median income for a family was $60,254. Males had a median income of $50,799 versus $26,055 for females. The per capita income for the town was $24,615. About 4.9% of families and 6.5% of the population were below the poverty line, including 7.7% of those under age 18 and 1.4% of those age 65 or over.

References

External links

 Town of Porter, Indiana website

Towns in Porter County, Indiana
Towns in Indiana